Misty Love is an American, multi-platinum award-winning rock, and Rhythm & Blues singer, who is best known for her association with Kid Rock, Sheryl Crow, and Ben Harper.

Biography
Misty Love was born in Tampa, Florida and was raised in Detroit, Michigan. Misty was influenced by the Motown sound, and decided to become a singer at a young age. She currently resides in both Detroit, Michigan and Las Vegas, Nevada.

After performing with many different bands around the Detroit area, her first big break came when she was selected as a replacement for Caroline Crawford to be the lead singer for Bohannon.

Between 1997 and 2003, Misty was a backing vocalist for Kid Rock, touring and appearing on the albums, Devil Without a Cause (1998), Cocky (2001), and Kid Rock (2003), and she also sang on the Kid Rock and Sheryl Crow platinum-selling song "Picture" (2003). She was featured on Kid Rock's breakout Grammy Award-nominated single "Bawitdaba", and "Cowboy".

During her time with Kid Rock, she appeared on many television shows and specials including Dick Clark's American Music Awards, The Tonight Show with Jay Leno, and The David Letterman Show.

Misty sang in the Grammy Award-winning movie Standing in the Shadows of Motown, and her vocals can also be heard in the soundtracks of the movies Coyote Ugly, Shanghai Noon, and Ready To Rumble.

In 2009, along with Motown Alumni Association President Billy Wilson, she helped to create the Detroit Black Music Awards, which are held annually on the first Sunday of August, at the Charles H. Wright Museum of African American History.

In association with the Motown Alumni Association, Misty Love has helped to produce several tribute shows including "A Tribute to Mary Wells", "A Tribute to Kim Weston", and "Tribute to the Motown Divas".

To celebrate John Lee Hooker's 100th birthday anniversary in 2017, Misty Love joined drummer Muruga Booker, Rock & Roll Hall of Fame inductee guitarist J.C. "Billy" Davis, P-Funk guitarist Tony "Strat" Thomas, and bassist John Sauter to form the Booker Blues All-Stars, and released a CD called Booker Plays Hooker.

Discography
 Kid Rock - Devil Without A Cause (1998)
 Various - Grammy Nominees 2000 (2000)
 Kid Rock - Cocky (2001)
 The Funk Brothers - Standing in the Shadows of Motown (Original Soundtrack) (2002)
 Sheryl Crow - The Very Best of Sheryl Crow (2003)
 Kid Rock - Kid Rock (2003)
 Ben Harper - Diamonds On the Inside (2003)
 The Funk Brothers - Standing in the Shadows of Motown (Original Soundtrack) (Deluxe Edition) (2004)
 Self Defense - Shipwreck Union (2005)
 Belita Woods - The Voice (2006)
 Billy Ray Charles - Drunk, Busted, Disgusted and Can't Be Trusted (2010)
 Booker, Dansby, Sauter & Love - The Hand I Was Dealt (2011)
 Kid Rock - The Studio Albums: 1998 - 2012 (Box Set) (2015)
 Booker Blues All Stars - Booker Plays Hooker (2017)

Awards
Misty Love is a recipient of one gold record, eleven platinum record, and ten diamond record awards for singing on the hit CD, Devil Without A Cause with Kid Rock. Misty also received a platinum CD for singing behind Kid Rock and Sheryl Crow on their 2003 hit song "Picture".

Misty love performed on "Standing in the Shadows of Motown" which won the 2003 Grammy Award for "Best Compilation Soundtrack Album for a Motion Picture, Television or Other Visual Media"

In 2014, Misty was awarded the "Spirit Award" by the R&B Hall of Fame.

References

Living people
American rock singers
American women rock singers
American blues singers
American soul singers
American women singers
Detroit blues musicians
Singers from Detroit
Year of birth missing (living people)
21st-century American women